Associazione Calcio Isola Liri is an Italian association football club located in Isola del Liri, Lazio. It currently plays in Serie D.

History 
The club was founded on 1925.

Lega Pro Seconda Divisione 
On 30 March 2008 Isola Liri mathematically won the Round G of Serie D, thus gaining promotion to Lega Pro Seconda Divisione and ensuring a historical first time into professional football in the 2008–09 season.

In the season 2011–12 it was relegated from Lega Pro Seconda Divisione B to Serie D.

Colors and badge 
Its colours are white and red.

Stadium 
The club plays its home matches at Stadio Conte Arduino Mangoni.

Club records 
Below is a table showing the participation of Isola Liri in the Italian leagues.

References

External links 
 Official homepage

Football clubs in Italy
Sports clubs established in 1902
Association football clubs established in 1925
Football clubs in Lazio
Serie C clubs
1925 establishments in Italy